The American Samoa national futsal team was formed by the Football Federation American Samoa, the governing body of futsal in American Samoa and represents the country in international futsal competitions. The team played the OFC Futsal Championship for the first 
time in 2019, losing all three matches.

Tournament records

FIFA Futsal World Cup record

Oceanian Futsal Championship record

Results and fixtures

Legend

2019 OFC Futsal Nations Cup

References

American Samoa
Oceanian national futsal teams
OFC Futsal Championship